Renusagar Power Plant is a coal based captive thermal power plant located near Renukoot in Sonbhadra district in the Indian state of Uttar Pradesh. The power plant is operated by the Hindalco Industries and gives power to the smelter (integrated plant), Renukoot for production of aluminium.

Capacity
It has an installed capacity of 801.57 MW (it has 10 generating units of various capacities). The plant is functional.

References

Coal-fired power stations in Uttar Pradesh
Buildings and structures in Sonbhadra district
Renukoot
Hindalco Industries
Year of establishment missing